The Rise is the fourth studio album by American rapper Futuristic. It was released independently on May 12, 2015. The album features guest appearances from D-Pryde, Samson, Casto and Devvon Terrell. The album was supported by two singles: "No Way" and "The Greatest".

Background
The album was announced on March 1, 2015 on Futuristic's website.

Promotion

Singles
The album's lead single, titled "No Way" was released on September 20, 2014. The music video was released two days later and was directed by Jakob Owens. Since its release, the music video has received over 14 million views. The song was produced by Twigg.

The album's second single, titled "The Greatest" was released on March 14, 2015. The music video was released four days later and was directed by Jakob Owens and shows Futuristic dressed as a nerd rapping for people in McClintock High School. The song and music video gained recognition after it was cross-promoted by another video uploaded by BigDawsTv on the same day tilted "Nerd Raps Fast in Compton!". Since its release, both the video and the music video has received over 28 million views. The song was produced by De-Capo Music Group.

Other songs
The album was promoted through various music videos with, "Too Easy", being released on May 13, 2015. The video shows Futuristic dressed as a nerd again rapping for people in ASU. The song and music video was cross-promoted again by an upload by BigDawsTv on the same day tilted "Nerd Raps Fast at Collage!".

The music video for "OD" featuring D-Pryde was released on May 17, followed up by "Let's Do Something" on May 31. "Raw" featuring Samson was released on June 14, followed up by "Man on a Mission" on August 2. "Music Saved my Life" was released on September 27, and "Call of Duty" featuring Castro was released on November 5. All music videos were directed by Jakob Owens.

Commercial performance
The Rise debuted at number 139 on the Billboard 200 for the chart dated May 30, 2015. The album also debuted on the Top R&B/Hip-Hop Albums and Rap Albums at number 13 and 10 respectively.

Track listing
Songwriting credits are adapted from the American Society of Composers, Authors and Publishers (ASCAP).

Charts

References

2015 albums
Futuristic (rapper) albums